This is a list of currently active separatist movements in Africa. Separatism includes autonomism and secessionism. What is and is not considered an autonomist or secessionist movement is sometimes contentious. Entries on this list must meet three criteria:
They are active movements with living, active members.
They are seeking greater autonomy or self-determination for a geographic region (as opposed to personal autonomy).
They are the citizen/inhabitants of the conflict area and do not come from another country.

Under each region listed is one or more of the following:
De facto state: for regions with de facto autonomy from the government
Proposed state: proposed name for a seceding sovereign state
Proposed autonomous area: for movements toward greater autonomy for an area but not outright secession
De facto autonomous government: for governments with de facto autonomous control over a region
Government-in-exile: for a government based outside of the region in question, with or without control
Political party (or parties): for political parties involved in a political system to push for autonomy or secession
Militant organisation(s): for armed separatist organisations
Advocacy group(s): for non-belligerent, non-politically participatory entities
Ethnic/ethno-religious/racial/regional/religious group(s)

Algeria

 Kabylia
 Ethnic group: Kabyle Berbers
 Proposed state: Kabylia (Berber language: Tagduda Taqbaylit).
 Government-in-exile: Kabyle Provisional Government (ANAVAD AQVAYLI UΣTIL).
 Movement leader: Ferhat Mehenni.
 Political party: Movement for the self-determination of Kabylie (Mak-Anavad).

Angola

Central-Eastern Angola
Ethnic group:  Lunda-Tchokwé people
 Proposed state: Lunda-Tchokwé (República Democrática da Lunda-Tchokwé) (RDLT)
 Government-in-exile: Partido Democrático da Defesa do Estado Lunda-Tchokwé (PDDELT), led by Dr. Jota Filipe Malakito
 Claimant group: Manifesto Jurídico Sociológico do Povo Lunda-Tchokwé (MJSPL), also an Advocacy group
 Political party: Partido Democrático da Defesa do Estado Lunda-Tchokwé (PDDELT)
 Movements: Mulher Unida da Lunda-Tchokwé (MULT), Pioneiros Unidos da Lunda-Tchokwé (PULT), Juventude Unida da Lunda-Tchokwé (JULT)

 Cabinda
 Ethnic group: Bakongo 
Proposed state: Republic of Cabinda
Government-in-exile: Frente para a Libertação do Enclave de Cabinda (FLEC) (member of the Unrepresented Nations and Peoples Organization)
Political party: Frente para a Libertação do Enclave de Cabinda (FLEC), Liberation Front of the State of Cabinda
Militant organization: Forças Armadas de Cabinda (FAC)
Status: Ongoing low-intensity war

Botswana 
Zambesia
 Ethnic group: River Races of Zambesia
 Militant organization: Movement for the Survival of the River Races of Zambesia
 Proposed state: Zambesia

Cameroon

 
 Ethnic group: Anglophones of the former Southern Cameroons, consisting of over 80 ethnic groups
Population: ~4 million people
Proposed state: Federal Republic of Ambazonia
 Advocacy group: Interim Government of Ambazonia, Ambazonia Governing Council and others
 Militant groups: Ambazonia Self-Defence Council, Ambazonia Defence Forces, SOCADEF, other smaller militias
 Status: Ongoing civil war

 Bakassi
 People: Oron
Population: 150,000–300,000 people (subject of dispute)
 Proposed state: Democratic Republic of Bakassi
 Militant groups: Bakassi Movement for Self-Determination
 Status: Active insurgency until 2009, isolated incidents until 2015

Bamileke
 ethnic group: Bamileke people
 proposed state: Bamileke
 political party: Bamileke National Movement

Central African Republic

 Dar El Kuti
 Ethnic group: Muslims in the Central African Republic
 Proposed state: Republic of Dar el-Kuti
 Advocacy group and militant organization: Séléka
Status: Ongoing civil war, effectively a proto-state

Comoros

 Ethnic group: Comorian
 Proposed state: 
Political parties: Anjouan People's Movement, Mouvement Populaire Anjouanais, Mawana

Ethnic group: Comorian
Proposed state: Mwali

Republic of the Congo

 South Congo (Brazzaville)
 Ethnic group: South Congolese
Advocacy group: Provisional Assembly and governance of the State of South Congo
Proposed state:  State of South Congo

Democratic Republic of the Congo

 Bas-Congo
Advocacy group: Bundu dia Kongo
Proposed state: Kingdom of Kongo

 Political parties: Union of Independent Federalists and Republicans
Militant organizations: Mai Mai Kata Katanga
Status: Sporadic violence

Egypt 
Nubia
 ethnic group: Nubians 
 proposed autonomous region: Nubia

Eritrea 
Southern Red Sea Region

 Ethnic group: Afar people, Saho people
 Proposed autonomous area or state:  Dankalia
 Advocacy groups: Red Sea Afar Democratic Organisation, Democratic Movement for the Liberation of the Eritrean Kunama, Saho People's Democratic Movement

Equatorial Guinea

 Bioko
 Ethnic group: Bubi
 Proposed state: Bioko Island
Advocacy group: Movement for the Self-Determination of Bioko Island

Ethiopia


Proposed state: Ogadenia (member of the Unrepresented Nations and Peoples Organization) or 
Political party: Ogaden National Liberation Front

Proposed state:  Oromia (member of the Unrepresented Nations and Peoples Organization)
Militant organizations: Oromo Liberation Front, Islamic Front for the Liberation of Oromia
Advocacy group: Qeerroo
 Tigray
Proposed state: Tigray
Political party: Tigray Independence Party
Status: Ongoing war

 Proposed: Self-determination for the Sidama people
 Militant organization: Sidama National Liberation Front

France

 Réunion
Secessionist movements:
Political party:  Lorganizasion Popilèr po Libèr nout Péi (Lplp) – Popular Front for National Liberation: composed of Nasion Rénioné, Mar, Drapo rouz, Patriot rénioné and Mir.
Political party: Communist Party of Réunion
Proposed state: Republic of Zabon

 Mayotte continues to have autonomist movements despite the island having voted to become France's 101st department in 2011.

Ghana

 Western Togoland
Proposed State: Western Togoland
Militant organizations:  Western Togoland Restoration Front

Member of the Unrepresented Nations and Peoples Organization (UNPO)

Kenya
 Mombasa
Proposed state: Mombasa Republic
Political party: Mombasa Republican Council
Status: Active

North Eastern Province

 ethnic group: Somalis in Kenya

Libya
 Cyrenaica
 ethnic group: arabs
 proposed state or autonomous region:  Cyrenaica 
 political party: Cyrenaica Transitional Council

 Toubouland
 ethnic group: Toubou people
 proposed state:  Toubouland
 political party: Toubou Front for the Salvation of Libya

Tuareg people
 ethnic group: Tuareg people
 proposed state: undeclared in Libya thought sympathetic toward 
 political parties: World Amazigh Congress and National Movement for the Liberation of Azawad(Mali based)

Mali

Ethnic group: Tuareg
 Proposed state: 
 Political party: Coordination of Azawad Movements, which includes MNLA
 Militant organisations: National Movement for the Liberation of Azawad

Mauritius

 Rodrigues
 Ethnic group: Rodriguan
 Proposed greater autonomy or state:  Rodrigues
 Political party: Rodrigues People's Organisation

Morocco

 Ethnic group: Riffian Berbers
 Proposed state: Republic of the Rif
Political party: Rif Independence Movement
Militant organisation(s): Rif Independence Movement
Started in Morocco during the 1920s, and was revitalized in 2013. The Rif Independence Movement is a charter member of the Organization of Emerging African States.

Namibia

Ethnic Group: Lozi
Proposed state: Caprivi Strip or unificiation with Barotsealand
Militant organization: Caprivi Liberation Army
 Barotse
Ethnic group: Lozi
 Proposed state: 
 Militant organization: Barotse Royal Establishment

 Rehoboth area
 Ethnic group: Baster
 Proposed autonomous area:  Rehoboth area
 Political party: The United People`s Movement (UPM) Rehoboth Basters (Member of the UNPO)
Zambesia
 Ethnic group:River Races of Zambesia
 Militant organization: Movement for the Survival of the River Races of Zambesia
 Proposed state: Zambesia

Nigeria

 Ethnic group: Igbo, Anioma, Igede, Igala, Idoma, Ijaw, Kalabari, Ibibio, and Ogoni.
Proposed state:  (defunct)
Separatist movements: The Indigenous People of Biafra, Biafra Zionist Movement, Movement for the Actualization of the Sovereign State of Biafra
Militant organization: Eastern Security Network
Government in exile: Biafran Government in exile

 Republic of Oduduwa 
 Ethnic group: Yorùbá ethnic groups in Ekiti, Lagos, Ogun, Ondo, Oyo, Osun, Kwara, Òkun in Kogi states in Nigeria, Itsekiris in Delta state and Akoko in Edo state. 
 Proposed state:  Republic of Oduduwa
 Member of the Unrepresented Nations and Peoples Organization
 Civic organizations: Ilana Omo Oodua, Nigerian Indigenous Nationalities Alliance for Self-Determination(NINAS)
 Movement leaders: Professor Stephen Adebanji Akintoye, Sunday Igboho 
 O'odua Grand Alliance for Independence & Oodua People's Congress Ogafi.org 
 Status: Constitutional Force Majeure

 Niger Delta
Ethnic group: Urhobo, Isoko, Itsekiri, Ijaw, Ukwuani, Edo, Esan, Ogoni, Kalabari and many more.
Proposed: Autonomous regionalism:  Niger Delta Republic was declared in February 1965 by Isaac Adaka Boro, but failed to be established and remains an inspiration if not an aspiration.
Movement: Movement for the Emancipation of the Niger Delta (MEND) formed in 2006 for the self-determination of the people of the Niger Delta
Militant groups: Niger Delta Avengers, Niger Delta Greenland Justice Mandate, Niger Delta Vigilante, Niger Delta People's Volunteer Force (NDPVF), and other groups
Status: Ongoing war

Senegal

 Ethnic group: Diola
Proposed state:  Republic of Casamance
Militant organization: Movement of Democratic Forces of Casamance

Somalia

 

Ethnic group: Somali, Arabs
 De facto state: 
 Political organisations: Government of Somaliland
 Militant organisation: Somaliland Armed Forces

Ethnic group; Somali people
De facto autonomous Region asking for greater autonomy:

South Africa

 Volkstaat
 Ethnic group: Afrikaners
Proposed state: Volkstaat
Political Party: Freedom Front Plus (in parliament and member of the Unrepresented Nations and Peoples Organization). Outside parliament: National Conservative Party of South Africa, Boerestaat Party, Herstigte Nasionale Party, Afrikaner Self-determination Party.
Advocacy group: Orania Movement
Status: Accord on Afrikaner self-determination

 Cape Republic / Cape of Good Hope

 Linguistic group: Afrikaans speakers, English Speakers, isiXhosa speakers
 Ethnic groups: Coloureds, Afrikaners, South African English, Xhosa
Proposed State: Western Cape (Cape Republic / Cape of Good Hope)
Political Parties: Cape Independence Party Freedom Front Plus 
Civic Organisations: CapeXit Cape Independence Advocacy Group (CIAG)

Spain

Secessionist movement

 People: Canarians
 Proposed state:  Republic of the Canary Islands
 Political parties (autonomist): Coalición Canaria, Partido Nacionalista Canario, Centro Canario Nacionalista, Nueva Canarias
 Political parties (secessionist): FREPIC-AWAÑAK, Alternativa Nacionalista Canaria, Alternativa Popular Canaria, Unidad del Pueblo
Trade union: Intersindical Canaria
 Youth movement: Azarug

Sudan

 Ethnic group: Fur, Arabs, Zaghawa, Masalit, Tama
 Proposed state: Darfur
Militant organization: Darfur Liberation Front
 Status: War in Darfur

Tanzania

Ethnic group: Arabs, Swahili
 Proposed state: 
Political party: Civic United Front (member of Unrepresented Nations and Peoples Organization), Uamsho

Zambia

 Barotse
Ethnic group: Lozi
 Proposed state: 
 Militant organization: Barotse Royal Establishment

Zimbabwe

Matabeleland
Ethnic group:  Matabele
 Proposed state: Mthwakazi
 Militant organization:  Mthwakazi Liberation Front (M.L.F.)
Political party: Matabeleland Freedom Party
Revolutionary Movement: Mthwakazi Republic Party (M.R.P)

See also
List of conflicts in Africa
Lists of active separatist movements
List of historical separatist movements

References

Separatist Movements, Active
Separatist Movements In Africa, Active
Africa
Separatist Movements In Africa, Active